Period pains may refer to; 

 Dysmenorrhea, the pain associated with menstruation
 Period Pains (band), a UK indie-punk band of the 1990s